Mike Haverty (born June 11, 1944) is a fourth generation railroader who began his career as a switchman/brakeman in 1963 for the Missouri Pacific Railroad in his hometown of Atchison, Kansas.  In 1970 he went to work for the Atchison, Topeka & Santa Fe Railway.  This ended a 105-year Haverty family affiliation with Missouri Pacific that started in 1865 when his great grandfather, an immigrant carpenter from County Galway, Ireland, began work as a laborer on a Bridge & Building gang for the railroad in Atchison.

Haverty spent 21 years at Santa Fe, mostly in operating department positions, before being elected president in 1989.  He served as president from 1989 to 1991.  He formed his own company, Haverty Corp, after leaving Santa Fe and traveled internationally looking for railroad investments.    In 1995 he was recruited to run the Kansas City Southern Railway.  In 2001 he became chairman, president and CEO of Kansas City Southern, a transportation holding company with railroads in the United States, Mexico and Panama. He retired from Kansas City Southern in 2015 after a 20-year career with the Company.

Awards include: Railway Age magazine's “Railroader of the Year” in 2001, as the architect of the NAFTA Railway;
Ernst & Young's Entrepreneur Of The Year® 2008 Award in the transportation category in the Central Midwest regional program and a finalist in the national program;  
Progressive Railroading magazine's 2011 Railroad Innovator Award, which recognizes an individuals’ outstanding achievement in the rail industry;
Official induction into the National Railroad Hall of Fame in Galesburg, Ill. in June 2012 after being selected as a member in 2006;
Whitman School of Management's Salzberg Medallion at Syracuse University in October 2012, which celebrates achievements in supply chain management; and 
National Industrial Transportation League and Logistics Magazine's 2014 Executive of the Year – The John T. McCullough Award in November 2014 in Ft. Lauderdale, Florida.

Haverty was educated by the Benedictines in grade school, high school and one year of college in Atchison before transferring after St. Benedict's College (now Benedictine College) dropped football and he transferred.  He went on to graduate from the University of Louisiana-Lafayette (BA), has an MBA from the University of Chicago and an Honorary PhD in Humane Letters from Benedictine College.

Haverty has been married to his wife, Marlys, for fifty-seven years and they have three children and eleven grandchildren. Mike and Marlys Haverty reside in Mission Hills, Kansas.  Their three children, and seven of their eleven grandchildren, live in the Kansas City Metropolitan area.

Since 2020, Haverty has been a minority stakeholder in the ownership group of the Kansas City Royals.

See also
List of railroad executives

References

1944 births
20th-century American railroad executives
21st-century American railroad executives
Atchison, Topeka and Santa Fe Railway presidents
Kansas City Southern Railway
Living people